Podeni may refer to several places in Romania:

Podeni, a commune in Mehedinţi County
Podeni, a village in Buzoești Commune, Argeș County
Podeni, a village in Corlăteni Commune, Botoşani County
Podeni, a village in Moldovenești Commune, Cluj County
Podeni, a village in Buneşti Commune, Suceava County
Podeni, a village in Vultureşti Commune, Vaslui County
Podeni, a village in Perișani Commune, Vâlcea County
Podenii, a village in Urmeniș Commune, Bistriţa-Năsăud County
Podenii Noi, a commune in Prahova County
Podenii Vechi, a village in Bălțești Commune, Prahova County